The alumni of Bryanston School are known as Old Bryanstonians or OBs.

Bryanston School is a co-educational independent school for both day and boarding pupils in Blandford, north Dorset, England, near the village of Bryanston.

Notable OBs

 Adrian Heath (1920–1992), painter
 Amy Studt (born 1986), singer
 Angus John Mackintosh Stewart (1936-1998), author of Sandel
 Anne Marie Morris (born 1957), politician
 Ben Fogle (born 1973), television presenter, adventurer
 Carolyn Fairbairn (born 1961), director-general of the Confederation of British Industry
 Cerys Matthews (born 1969), singer-songwriter
 Charles Handley-Read (1916-1971), architectural critic
 Chris Beckett (born 1955), science fiction author
 Clive Barda OBE (born 1945), photographer
 Clive Seale (born 1955), sociologist
 David Campbell Bannerman (born 1960), Conservative MEP
 David Lipsey, Baron Lipsey, (born 1948) politician, journalist, Labour life peer
 Drummond Matthews (1931–1997), geologist and marine geophysicist
 Eliot Paulina Sumner (born 1990), singer
 Ella Marchment (born 1992), opera and theatre director
 Emilia Fox (born 1974), actress
 Freddie Fox (born 1989), actor
 Frederick Sanger (1918–2013), biochemist; the fourth person to become a double Nobel Laureate
 Geoffrey Hoyle (born 1942), science fiction writer (son of Fred Hoyle)
 Giselle Norman (born 2001), fashion model
 Greg Hersov (born 1956), theatre director
 HRH Princess Haya of Jordan (born 1974), daughter of King Hussein I of Jordan
 Henry Pyrgos (born 1989), rugby player for Glasgow and captain for Scotland
 Humphrey Kay (1923–2009), pathologist and haematologist
 Huw Bennett (born 1983), rugby player for Ospreys and Wales
 Iain Tuckett, pioneer in urban regeneration
 Jago Cooper (born 1977), archaeologist
 James Scott (born 1941), filmmaker
 Jasper Conran (born 1959), fashion designer
 Jasper Morrison (born 1959), designer
 John Eliot Gardiner (born 1943), conductor
 John Nissen (born 1942), founder of Cloudworld
 Jonathan Bowen (born 1956), computer scientist
 Jonathan Gathorne-Hardy (1933-2019), author
 Julian Vereker (1945–2000), electronic engineer
 Justin Urquhart Stewart (born 1955), investment manager
 Kevin Crossley-Holland (born 1941), children's author and poet
 Kwame Anthony Appiah (born 1954), philosopher and novelist
 Lara Cazalet (born 1971), actress
 Lucian Freud (1922-2011), painter
 Mark Scott (1923–2013), rower who competed in the 1948 Summer Olympics
 Sir Mark Elder CBE (born 1947), conductor
 Martin Checksfield (1939-2002), first-class cricketer
 Max Irons (born 1985), actor
 Michael Yates (1919–2001), stage and television designer and executive
 Myles Burnyeat (1939-2019), classicist and philosopher
 Nicholas Logsdail (born 1945), art dealer
 Nicholas Phillips, Baron Phillips of Worth Matravers (born 1938), Master of the Rolls, 2000–2005, and Lord Chief Justice of England and Wales from 2005-2008
 Nick Meers (born 1955), landscape photographer
 Nick Willing (born 1961), filmmaker
 Nigel Barker (born 1972), fashion photographer, judge on America's Next Top Model
 Ollie Devoto (born 1993), rugby player for Bath and Exeter
 Paul Thompson (born 1959), Rector of the Royal College of Art
 Phil de Glanville (born 1968), rugby player for Bath and England, 38 caps, captain of England 
 Philip Trevelyan (born 1943), film director
 Prince Alastair of Connaught (1914–1943), member of the British Royal Family
 Quinlan Terry (born 1937), architect 
 Richard Bawden (born 1936), painter, printmaker
 Robert Saxton (born 1953), composer
 Robert Baden-Powell, 3rd Baron Baden-Powell (1936-2019) grandson of Robert Baden-Powell, 1st Baron Baden-Powell (1857-1941)
 Roger Hammond (1936–2012), actor 
 Saira Shah (born 1964), journalist and documentary filmmaker
 Sebastian Conran (born 1956), designer
 Simon Napier-Bell (born 1939), pop group manager, writer and journalist
 Sir Francis Ferris QC (1932–2018), High Court Judge
 Sir Howard Hodgkin (1932-2017), painter
 Sir Terence Conran (1931-2020), designer, restaurateur and retailer
 Sir Tony Durant (1928-2016), politician
 Tahir Shah (born 1966), writer and television presenter
 William Herbert, 18th Earl of Pembroke politician and aristocrat

References

Bryanston School
Dorset-related lists